Idrottsföreningen Kamraterna Norrköping, also known as IFK Norrköping or simply Norrköping, is a Swedish professional football club based in Norrköping.During the 2017 campaign they will be competing in the following competitions: Allsvenskan, Svenska Cupen.

Competitions

Allsvenskan

Results summary

Results by matchday

Matches

UEFA Europa League

External links
 IFK Norrköping – official site
 Peking Fanz – official supporter club site
 IFK Norrköpings Supporter klubb – official supporter club site for seniors
 gopeking.net – IFK Norrköpings oldest supporter site
 Parkens vita hjältar – supporter site

IFK Norrköping seasons
Norrköping